"I Won't Change You" is a song written by Sophie Ellis-Bextor, Gregg Alexander, and Matt Rowe for Ellis-Bextor's second album, Shoot from the Hip (2003). The song was released as the album's second single on 29 December 2003, reaching number nine on the UK Singles Chart and selling 29,000 copies.

Music video
When the music video was filmed, Sophie was pregnant. The video features Ellis-Bextor speed dating, changing her looks multiple times to attract a partner. First, she wears a brown wig consisting of a part down the middle of her head and a ponytail on either side, after a second round with the same man, merely taking off her gold trenchcoat to reveal a tight-fitting black dress underneath. She looks like an informal, yet sophisticated red-headed woman. Progressively, she then becomes a black-haired woman, the hair being short, full and curly. After staring into her drink, which suspectingly turns bright blue, she is seen dancing with the man who she continuously changes for, in a blue dress and a Marilyn Monroe-esque blonde wig. Finally, we see her in a black headscarf with long wavy blonde hair. All the while, she is singing to the same man, who finds this night of speed dating an escalating amusement and she eventually ends up in his arms, with editing techniques changing which "Sophie" is in his arms. Throughout the video, there are scenes of Sophie in the bathroom in her original look singing to the mirror and changing outfits in a stall. The video was directed and co-produced by Sophie Muller.

Track listings
UK CD1
 "I Won't Change You" – 3:43
 "I Won't Change You" (Solaris vocal mix) – 7:43
 "Yes Sir, I Can Boogie" – 3:59
 "I Won't Change You" (CD-ROM video)

UK CD2
 "I Won't Change You" – 3:43
 "Murder on the Dancefloor" (Phunk Investigation vocal mix) – 8:35

European maxi-CD single
 "I Won't Change You" – 3:43
 "Murder on the Dancefloor" (Phunk Investigation vocal mix) – 8:35
 "Yes Sir, I Can Boogie" – 3:59

Charts

Sales

|}

Release history

References

2003 singles
2003 songs
Music videos directed by Trudy Bellinger
Polydor Records singles
Song recordings produced by Gregg Alexander
Songs written by Gregg Alexander
Songs written by Matt Rowe (songwriter)
Songs written by Sophie Ellis-Bextor
Sophie Ellis-Bextor songs